In the Peruvian electoral system, for a candidate to be proclaimed the winner, they must obtain more than 50% of valid votes. In case no candidate achieves that percentage in the first electoral round, the two candidates with the most votes participate in a second round or ballot.

In the run-up to the next Peruvian general election, various organizations conduct opinion polls to measure the intention to vote in Peru in the previous period. The results of these surveys are shown in this article. The date range for these opinion polls is from the runoff of the previous general election, held on 6 June 2021, to the present.

Voting intention estimates refer mainly to a hypothetical election of the President of the Republic. Intent polls and mock ballots are listed in reverse chronological order, showing the most recent first and using the dates the poll was conducted in the field rather than the date of publication. When fieldwork dates are unknown, the publication date is given instead.

Peruvian electoral law prohibits the dissemination of polls in the week prior to the day of the electoral suffrage.

Presidential

Graphical summary

Voting preferences

Parliamentary

Notes

References 

Peru